Big Top Halloween is the first album by the band The Afghan Whigs. It was released in 1988 via Ultrasuede.

Two thousand copies of the record were pressed.

Critical reception
Trouser Press wrote that "there's a surprising amount of subtlety — sophistication, even — rustling beneath the boozy, gutter-rat surface of the quartet's self-released debut . . . an altogether terrific debut."

Track listing
All tracks written by Greg Dulli and John Curley. 
 "Here Comes Jesus"
 "In My Town"
 "Priscilla's Wedding"
 "Push"
 "Scream"
 "But Listen"
 "Big Top Halloween"
 "Life in a Day"
 "Sammy"
 "Doughball"
 "Back o' the Line"
 "Greek Is Extra"

References

External links
Album track listing on the Summer's Kiss website

The Afghan Whigs albums
1988 debut albums